Luke Killeen (born 16 April 2005) is an Australian speedway rider. He currently rides in the second tier of British Speedway, for the Oxford Cheetahs in the SGB Championship.

Speedway career
Killeen came to prominence when he won the Australian 125cc national title in 2020. For the 2022 season, he signed for the newly reformed Oxford Cheetahs National Development team called the Oxford Chargers. After a four month delay with passport issues he made his debut.

In 2023, he moved up to ride for the Oxford Cheetahs senior team for the SGB Championship 2023 but also remained with the Chargers for the 2023 NDL season.

References 

2005 births
Living people
Australian speedway riders
Oxford Cheetahs riders